José Carlos Ramírez Suárez (born 10 May 1996), known as José Carlos, is a Spanish professional footballer who plays for AD Alcorcón as a central defender.

Club career
Born in Paradas, Seville, Andalusia, José Carlos joined Real Betis' youth setup in 2004, aged eight. In 2007, after being rarely used, he returned to his hometown and joined Paradas Balompié, returning to Betis only in 2010.

On 5 October 2014 José Carlos made his debut with the reserves, starting in a 0–2 Segunda División B home loss against UCAM Murcia CF. He became an undisputed starter for the side shortly after, contributing with 22 appearances during his first campaign.

On 4 April 2016, José Carlos renewed his contract until 2019. Promoted to the first team ahead of the 2016–17 season, he made his professional debut on 29 November by starting in a 1–0 Copa del Rey home win against Deportivo de La Coruña.

José Carlos made his La Liga debut on 4 December 2016, playing the full 90 minutes in a 3–3 home draw against Celta de Vigo. The following 8 August, he was loaned to Lorca FC, newly promoted to Segunda División, for one year.

On 31 January 2018, José Carlos was loaned to fellow second tier club CD Lugo for six months, with a permanent contract agreed after the expiration of the loan deal. He scored his first professional goal on 19 October 2019, netting the opener in a 3–2 home win against SD Huesca.

On 4 August 2020, free agent José Carlos signed a two-year contract with AD Alcorcón, still in division two.

Honours

International
Spain U19
UEFA European Under-19 Championship: 2015

References

External links

José Carlos at Beticopedia 

1996 births
Living people
People from Campiña de Morón y Marchena
Sportspeople from the Province of Seville
Spanish footballers
Footballers from Andalusia
Association football defenders
La Liga players
Segunda División B players
Tercera División players
Betis Deportivo Balompié footballers
Real Betis players
Lorca FC players
CD Lugo players
AD Alcorcón footballers
Spain youth international footballers